The Bunun Cultural Museum is a museum about Bunun people in Haiduan Township, Taitung County, Taiwan.

History
The museum was established in 2002 due to the close connection between the township and the Bunun people. The museum establishment makes Haiduan the first indigenous township in Taiwan to construct a local museum.

Architecture
The museum building consists of two floors. The first floor is the tourist center of Southern Cross-Island Highway, while the second floor is the Bunun Story House. Outside the museum is a performance area for important Bunun tribal and cultural events.

Exhibitions
The museum displays waxen statues of Bunun tribesmen, embossment works and wood carvings. Numerous old photos are hung along the corridor.

Transportation
The museum is accessible within walking distance south of Haiduan Station of Taiwan Railways.

See also
 List of museums in Taiwan
 Taiwanese aborigines

References

External links
  

2002 establishments in Taiwan
Museums established in 2002
Museums in Taitung County